The Ghent Bio-Energy Valley is a joint initiative, started in 2005, of Ghent University, the city of Ghent, the Port of Ghent, the Development Agency East Flanders and a number of industrial companies. The initiative aims at the development of biofuels and bio-enzymes. It is an initiative of Professor Wim Soetaert of the university and aiming towards a bio-based economy.

The initiative is centered on:
 Stimulation of technological innovation
 Industrial integration and clustering
 Public acceptance and sensibilisation.

See also
 European Biofuels Technology Platform

References

External links
 Ghent Bio-Energy Valley
 Ghent Bio-Energy Valley (Dutch)
 bio-based economy (Dutch)

Science parks in Belgium
Flanders
Geography of East Flanders
Geography of Ghent